Strabena zanjuka is a butterfly in the family Nymphalidae. It is found on Madagascar.

References

Strabena
Butterflies described in 1885
Endemic fauna of Madagascar
Butterflies of Africa
Taxa named by Paul Mabille